Drake is an unincorporated community in Gasconade County, in the U.S. state of Missouri.

History
A post office called Drake was established in 1868, and remained in operation until 1936. The community has the name of Charles D. Drake (1811–1892), United States Senator.

The Ruskaup House was listed on the National Register of Historic Places in 1983.

References

Unincorporated communities in Gasconade County, Missouri
Unincorporated communities in Missouri